Neurotic may refer to:

 Neurosis, a class of functional mental disorders involving distress but neither delusions nor hallucinations
 Neuroticism, a fundamental personality trait characterized by anxiety, moodiness, worry, envy and jealousy

 The Newtown Neurotics, or simply The Neurotics, an English punk rock band
 Neurotic (EP), an EP by the US punk band The Bouncing Souls